Chantal Seggiaro (born 4 April 1956) is a French gymnast. She competed in five events at the 1976 Summer Olympics.

References

1956 births
Living people
French female artistic gymnasts
Olympic gymnasts of France
Gymnasts at the 1976 Summer Olympics
Place of birth missing (living people)
20th-century French women